Kenia Carcaces Opón (born 22 January 1986, in Holguín) is a Cuban volleyball player who competed in the 2008 Summer Olympics, finishing fourth with the Cuban team in the Olympic tournament. She won the 2007 Pan American Games gold medal in Rio de Janeiro, Brazil.

Career
At the 2007 Cuban Liga Nacional, she was selected Best Digger. Playing Ciudad de La Habana, she won the Cuban National League Championship for the 2010 season and also being selected Best Spiker.

At the 2010 Montreux Volley Masters her national team finished in 3rd place, and she was selected Best Scorer and Most Valuable Player.

Kenia won with his national team the silver medal at the 2011 Pan American Games held in Guadalajara, Mexico.

Carcaces played at the 2013 Club World Championship with Voléro Zürich and she was selected Best Outside Hitter. Her team lost the bronze medal to Guangdong Evergrande.

Carcaces won the Best Outside Spiker among the Best Team of the 2014 FIVB Club World Championship after her club lost the bronze medal to the Brazilian SESI-SP 2-3.

In the 2015 South American Club Championship, Carcaces won the Most Valuable Player award and the silver medal in the continental championship.

Clubs
  Holguín
  Hisamitsu Springs (2005–2006)
  Ciudad de La Habana (2009–2010)
  Voléro Zürich (2013–2014)
  Molico Osasco (2014–2016)
  Voléro Zürich (2016–2017)
  Saitama Ageo Medics (2017–2018)
  VBC Èpiù Casalmaggiore (2018–2020)
  Wealth Planet Perugia Volley (2020–2021)
  Volley Vallefoglia (2020–present)

Awards

Individual
 2005–06 V.Premier League "Best Scorer"
 2007 Cuban Liga Nacional "Best Spiker"
 2010 Cuban Liga Nacional "Best Digger"
 2010 Montreux Volley Masters "Most Valuable Player"
 2010 Montreux Volley Masters "Best Scorer"
 2010 Pan-American Cup "Best Scorer"
 2013 FIVB Club World Championship "Best Outside Hitter"
 2014 FIVB Club World Championship "Best Outside Hitter"
 2015 South American Club Championship "Most Valuable Player"

Club
 2005–06 V.Premier League -  Runner-up, with Hisamitsu Springs
 2006 Kurowashiki All Japan Volleyball Tournament -  Champion, with Hisamitsu Springs
 2010 Cuban Liga Nacional -  Champion, with Ciudad de La Habana
 2015 South American Club Championship -  Champion, with Molico/Osasco
 2017 FIVB Club World Championship -  Bronze medal, with Voléro Zürich

National team

Senior team
 2007 Montreux Volley Masters -  Silver medal
 2007 Pan American Games -  Gold medal
 2007 NORCECA Championship -  Gold medal
 2008 FIVB World Grand Prix -  Silver medal
 2010 Montreux Volley Masters -  Bronze medal
 2011 Montreux Volley Masters -  Silver medal
 2011 Pan American Games -  Silver medal

Junior team
 2002 NORCECA Women´s Junior Continental Championship U-20 -  Bronze medal

References

External links
 FIVB profile
 

1986 births
Living people
Cuban women's volleyball players
Cuban expatriate sportspeople in Japan
Cuban expatriate sportspeople in Switzerland
Expatriate volleyball players in Switzerland
Olympic volleyball players of Cuba
Volleyball players at the 2008 Summer Olympics
Volleyball players at the 2011 Pan American Games
People from Holguín
Pan American Games silver medalists for Cuba
Pan American Games gold medalists for Cuba
Pan American Games medalists in volleyball
Opposite hitters
Outside hitters
Cuban expatriate sportspeople in Brazil
Expatriate volleyball players in Japan
Expatriate volleyball players in Brazil
Medalists at the 2011 Pan American Games
Cuban expatriate sportspeople in Italy
Expatriate volleyball players in Italy